Russell Creek is an unincorporated community located in southeast Patrick County, Virginia that encompasses a large portion of the county's population. The community is mainly rural residential, with the community center serving as the voting precinct location.

Unincorporated communities in Virginia
Unincorporated communities in Patrick County, Virginia